Ingleby Greenhow is a village and civil parish in the Hambleton district of North Yorkshire, England.

The parish of Ingleby Greenhow has records of a John Thomasson de Grenehow, a member of the clergy, who in 1376 "had to appear before a Commission appointed to be tried with several others for either poaching or cutting down timber, or destroying property belonging to Peter de Malo Luca the 6th, of Mulgrave Castle".
 The name may derive from the Saxon for Englishman's green hill. How, derived from the Old Norse word haugr, means hill or mound. The manor was bought by a Scottish courtier David Foulis in 1608. The parish church, St Andrew, was almost entirely rebuilt in 1741, but has an early Norman chancel arch inside.

In 1931, British altitude and distance records for gliders were established over the moors near here, as recounted by the novelist, pilot, and aeronautical engineer Nevil Shute in his memoir, Slide Rule. The glider, a Tern produced by Shute's company, Airspeed Ltd. was flown by a skilled German sailplane pilot, Carl Magersuppe, who had been hired by Airspeed.

Sport 
Ingleby Greenhow Cricket Club has a history dating back to the mid nineteenth century. It once featured in a calendar comprising England's most picturesque cricket pitches. The club's ground is situated half a kilometer west of the village, on the north side of Marsh Lane. The club have two senior teams: a Saturday 1st XI that compete in the Langbaurgh Cricket League and a Midweek Senior XI in the Esk Valley Evening League.

References

External links

Villages in North Yorkshire
Civil parishes in North Yorkshire